The following is a list of the various institutes set up as subsidiary bodies of the German "Ahnenerbe" organization.

Social Sciences
Indogermanisch-arische Sprach- und Kulturwissenschaft (Indogermanic-Aryan Language and Cultural Studies), director: Walther Wüst
Indogermanisch-germanische Sprach- und Kullturwissenschaft (Indogermanic-Germanic Language and Cultural Studies)
Germanische Kulturwissenschaft und Landschaftskunde (Germanic Cultural Studies and Landscape Science)
Germanische Sprachwissenschaft und Landschaftskunde (Germanic Linguistics and Landscape Science), director: Bruno Schweizer
Indogermanische Glaubensgeschichte (Indogermanic Faith history), director: Otto Huth
Indogermanische Rechtsgeschichte (Indogermanic Historical jurisprudence), director: Wilhelm Ebel
Indogermanisch-deutsche Musik (Indogermanic-German Music)
Germanisch-deutsche Volkskunde (Germanic-German Folklore)
Deutsche Volksforschung und Volkskunde (German Ethnic Research and Folklore)
Volkserzählung, Märchen und Sagenkunde (Folktales, Fairytales and Myths)
Runen, Schrift und Sinnbildkunde (Runes, Alphabets, and Symbols), director: Wolfgang Krause
Hausmarken und Sippenzeichen (House Brands and Family Marks)
Ortung und Landschaftssinnbilder (Location and Landscape symbols)
Ausgrabungen (Excavations), director: Herbert Jankuhn
Germanisches Bauwesen (Germanic Architecture)
Wurtenforschung (Dwelling Mound Research), today called Niedersächsisches Institut für historische Küstenforschung
Urgeschichte (Prehistory)
Keltische Volksforschung (Celtic ethnic research)
Indogermanisch-finnische Kulturbeziehungen (Indogermanic-Finnish cultural relations), director: Yrjö von Grönhagen
Klassische Archäologie (Classic Archaeology)
Klassische Altertumswissenschaft (Classical Antiquity)
Alte Geschichte (Ancient History)
Mittlere und Neuere Geschichte (Middle and Modern History)
Griechische Philologie (Greek Philology)
Lateinische Philologie (Latin Philology)
Mittellatein (Medieval Latin), director: Paul Lehmann
Innerasien und Expeditionen (Inner Asia and Expeditions), director: Ernst Schäfer
Vorderer Orient (Near East)
Ostasien-Institut (East Asian Institute)
Orientalistische Indologie (Oriental Indology)
Nordwestafrikanische Kulturwissenschaft (Northwest African Cultural Studies)
Philosophie (Philosophy)

Natural Sciences

Gesamte Naturwissenschaft ("Natural Science")
Darstellende und angewandte Naturkunde ("Descriptive and Applied Natural History"), director: Eduard Paul Tratz
Biologie ("Biology")
Entomologie ("Entomology")
Astronomie ("Astronomy")
Pferdezucht ("Horse Breeding")
Botanik ("Botany")
Pflanzengenetik ("Plant Genetics"), director: Heinz Brücher
Karst- und Höhlenkunde ("Speleology")
Naturwissenschaftliche Vorgeschichte ("Scientific History")
Tiergeographie und Tiergeschichte ("Zoogeography and Animal History")
Angewandte Geologie ("Applied Geology")
Geologische Zeitmessung ("Geochronology")
Geophysik ("Geophysics")
Kernphysik ("Nuclear Physics")
Volksmedizin ("Folk Medicine")
Osteologie ("Osteology")
Überprüfung der sogenannten Geheimwissenschaften ("Examination of the so-called secret sciences"), only planned for; the institute was not established
Wehrwissenschaftliche Zweckforschung ("Military Scientific Research"), director: Kurt Plötner, cooperated with the professors Alwin Walther and Kurt Walter

See also
Ahnenerbe

References
Epstein, Fritz T., War-Time Activities of the SS-Ahnenerbe (in )

Nazi culture
Nazi Party organizations
Ahnenerbe
Ahnenerbe